Alexander Zaïd (1886 – 10 July 1938) was one of the founders of the Jewish defense organizations Bar Giora and Hashomer, and a prominent figure of the Second Aliyah.

Biography
Zaïd was born in 1886 in Zima, a town in Irkutsk Oblast, Siberia.  His father had been deported from Vilna to Siberia due to revolutionary activity and his mother was a Subbotnik. In 1889, the family moved to Irkutsk. In 1901 they returned to Vilna, where his father remarried. Two years later, the father died, too. The orphaned teenager met Michael Helpern, a First Aliyah pioneer sent to Vilna to promote immigration to Palestine.  Zaid moved to Palestine in 1904, under the auspices of the Zionist Labour Movement. He worked at the winery in Rishon Letzion, where he met Israel Shochat, as a construction worker in Ben Shemen and a stonemason in Jerusalem.

In 1907, he helped establish the first Jewish watchmen's organization, the clandestine "Bar-Giora". Two years later, in 1909, he was one of the founders of Hashomer, a Jewish defense organization, to safeguard the Jewish agricultural settlements in Palestine.

Zaid and his wife Tzippora were founders of Kibbutz Kfar Giladi in the Galilee, which became a center of Hashomer's underground activity. In 1926, following the establishment of the Haganah, David Ben-Gurion demanded that Hashomer become subordinate to the new organization and transfer its weapons to it. Zaid and his wife supported this move, but most members of Kfar Giladi were opposed to it. As a result, the Zaids were forced to leave the kibbutz with their four young children. Zaid moved to Sheikh Abreik in the Valley of Jezreel, where he worked as a watchman, overseeing the lands of the JNF. The residents of the Arab village at the site had been evicted a few years earlier when the Sursuk family of Beirut sold the land. The locality was known to have archaeological importance but had never been excavated. In 1936, Zaid reported that he had found a breach in the wall of one of the known caves which led to another cave decorated with inscriptions. This led to the excavation of the site and its identification as Beit She'arim.

Zaïd survived two attacks by Arabs, but on the night of 10 July 1938, he was killed. He was ambushed by an Arab gang while on his way to meet members of kibbutz Alonim. The killer was Qassem Tabash, a Bedouin from the al-Hilaf tribe. In 1942, the Palmach killed Tabash in retaliation. Zaïd was survived by his wife and four children.

Commemoration
On a hilltop overlooking the Jezreel Valley is a bronze statue of Alexander Zaïd on horseback sculpted by David Polus. Givat Zaid and Beit Zaid were named after him. The poet Alexander Penn dedicated his poem, Adamah, Admati ("Land, My Land") to Alexander Zaïd.

External links
Rare video of Alexander Zaid's family in the 1930s
Alexander and Zipporah Zaid Collection on the Digital collections of Younes and Soraya Nazarian Library, University of Haifa

References

Russian Jews
Russian Zionists
Labor Zionists
Haganah
Members of the Assembly of Representatives (Mandatory Palestine)
Jewish socialists
1886 births
1938 deaths
People murdered in Mandatory Palestine
People from Zima (town)
Emigrants from the Russian Empire to the Ottoman Empire